Panuwat Meenapa is a professional footballer from Thailand. He is currently playing for Navy in Thai League 3 as an attacking midfielder.

References

External links
 

1991 births
Living people
Panuwat Meenapa
Association football midfielders
Panuwat Meenapa
Panuwat Meenapa
Panuwat Meenapa